Medieval reenactment is a form of historical reenactment that focuses on re-enacting European history in the period from the fall of Rome to about the end of the 15th century. The second half of this period is often called the Middle Ages. This multiplicity of terms is compounded by the variety of other terms used for the period.

The first period is sometimes called the Migration Period or Dark Ages by Western European historians, and as Völkerwanderung ("wandering of the peoples") by German historians. This term is usually reserved for the 5th and 6th centuries. Re-enactors who re-create the next period of history - 7th to 11th centuries - often refer to this as Early medieval. The 12th to 14th centuries fall under the term High medieval, while the 15th century is often termed Late medieval.

With such a wide range of eras most medieval reenactment groups focus on a smaller time period, sometimes restricting their interest to a particular century, or even a specific decade, series of battles, or monarch, depending on how authentic the reenactment and encampment is intended to be.

Living history 

Medieval period oriented living history groups and reenactors focus on recreating civilian or military life in period of the Middle Ages. It is very popular in Eastern Europe. The goal of the reenactor and their group is to portray an accurate interpretation of a person who credibly could exist at a specific place at a specific point in time while at the same time remaining approachable to the public. Examples of living history activities include authentic camping, cooking, practicing historical skills and trades, and playing historical musical instruments or board games.

Renaissance Fair participants generally borrow from a range of history and often incorporate fantasy or Hollywood-inspired elements into a presentation for public entertainment. In contrast, activities of the Society for Creative Anachronism (SCA) include everything from artistic disguises for modern items such as ice chests, to exhaustive research and authentic living history events.

Combat reenactment 

The principal aim of this sort of reenactment is to re-create historical battles or methods of combat.  The variations range from training of historical dueling practices (usually with an appropriate period sword such as an arming sword or rapier and wrestling as a martial art), to reenactment of historical or legendary battles of the medieval period.

Some groups treating historical combat as a martial art do not fit the traditional definition of a reenactment group and are more similar to fencing clubs. An example is the SCA, which uses rattan swords to avoid injury. Others combine the sport with more traditional forms of reenactment, such as living history.  It is usual to fight using more restricted target areas than in a real fight and with less speed and force, although some systems try to get as close to real combat as possible. 
Many societies try to reenact actual battles on or near the battle site.  These events are usually open to the public to watch.  Other societies such as the SCA hire venues for private events, including combat, without any public present.

The Federation of the Wars of the Roses is a British–based society which specialises in reenactments of the 15th Century. It stages events at historical sites all over Britain, including those on or near actual battle sites. There are rules on weapons, clothing and armour which are observed by the Households that are Federation members. New Households wishing to enter the Federation are sponsored by established ones, and endure a probationary period to ensure standards are observed.

Reenactment in Europe 

There have been many isolated examples of medieval reenactment in Europe, notably the Eglinton Tournament of 1839.  In modern times, medieval reenactment has been popular in the United Kingdom, starting in the late 1960s and growing every year since, with groups from all over England, Scotland, Ireland and Wales participating in events. Many UK battles are reenacted at their original battle sites by enthusiasts with a high degree of authenticity, together with Medieval traders, musicians, caterers. UK reenactors can be seen throughout the country during the summer months at battles, fairs, carnivals, fetes, pubs and schools. Almost entirely throughout the UK, reenactors use blunted steel weapons for reenactments and rubber tipped arrows (blunts) for archers, or steel heads when target shooting. The largest early medieval event in the UK is the Battle of Hastings reenactment, which in 2006 had over 3600 registered participants and combined living history and combat reenactment. Most UK battles have at some point been reenacted such as the Battle of Lewes and the Battle of Evesham, many historical battles are reenacted annually from periods such as the Wars of the Roses, including the Battle of Bosworth Field and the Battle of Tewkesbury.  Others are carried out at irregular intervals depending on the site availability and funding for the event, such as the Battle of Bannockburn.

Belgium has at least two dozen separate groups of medieval reenactors, including the Order of the Hagelanders, the Gentsche Ghesellen and the Gruuthuse Household serving Lewis de Bruges, lord of Gruuthuse.

The open air museum Middelaldercentret uses living history and historical reenactment to portrait a part of a small Danish merchant town. Several reenactment groups exists in Denmark which are doing medieval reenactment at markets around the country.

In France there is an annual reenactment of the Battle of Agincourt representing a battle of the Hundred Years War.

In Germany medieval reenactment is usually associated with living history and renaissance fairs and festivals as e.g. the Peter and Paul festival in Bretten. or the Schloss Kaltenberg knights tournament. In the past few years combat reenactment has gained some ground as well. A few groups are training historical combat such as longsword dueling and dussack fighting at universities, but the majority of combat reenactment groups are battlefield reenactment groups, some of which have become isolated to some degree because of a strong focus on authenticity (some groups refuse to fight groups representing different or wider periods, even if the combat practices would be entirely compatible otherwise). In general, the specific German approach of Authenticity (reenactment) is less about replaying a certain event, but to allow an immersion in a certain era. Historic city festivals and events are quite important to build up local communities and contribute to the self-image of municipalities. Events in monuments or on historical sites are less about the events related to them but as mere staffage for the immersion experience.

Among many battlefield reenactors in Germany, the Codex Belli has become a de facto standard.

Groups from Central Europe, especially Hungary, are rumored  to practice much more dangerous forms of battlefield reenactment, sometimes with sharp edges and points as well as metal arrow heads and an overall higher acceptance of the risk of injury posed by these dangers. This more risky, although more realistic, form of reenactment is apparently also practiced in former East Germany.

In Poland, the Battle of Grunwald reenactment every year on 15 July is the best known and attracts participants and visitors from many other countries. It is associated with living history and a medieval fair.

In Sweden there are many different "medieval markets". The largest is the one in Gotland.
In Szeklerland, Transylvania are many Hun, szekler knight, early Hungarian and hussar reenactment groups and camps.
One of those is the Szekler knights (Lofos) reenactment group in Torboszlo.

In Portugal there is one of the biggest historical recreations in Europe that takes place every summer called Viagem Medieval em Terra de Santa Maria. This event has won several international prizes given by different entities such as Global Eventex Awards (Ireland, 2017), Awards Eventoplus (Spain, 2017), Moros d’Alqueria Foundation (Spain, 2016), Trip Advisor (2015), among others. Each year the reign of a different king in Portuguese history is portrayed and it lasts about 12 days. There are different shows every hour happening at the same time and you can also buy tickets to customized experiences.

Notes

Music

 Medieval troubadour re-enactment in The Netherlands: https://www.youtube.com/watch?v=iGSQZckB7SM

Video
 Training game of university medieval reenactment group https://www.facebook.com/photo.php?v=898205227732&set=vb.164774960283827&type=3&theater
 Training session of university medieval reenactment group https://www.facebook.com/photo.php?v=977501202962&set=vb.164774960283827&type=3&theater
 NEW Medieval arrow crafting: https://www.youtube.com/watch?v=Y-Xm0WbSoZA
 NEW Medieval bar re-enactment in The Netherlands: https://www.youtube.com/watch?v=s-OThR5Xrqk
 Medieval HANDCRAFTING re-enactment in The Netherlands: https://www.youtube.com/watch?v=qOplSgPVC78
 Medieval WAR re-enactment in The Netherlands: https://www.youtube.com/watch?v=YK2ThIplso0
 Medieval BLACKSMITH re-enactment in The Netherlands: https://www.youtube.com/watch?v=5r14738M7Mc
 Medieval CHILDREN FUN BATTLE re-enactment https://www.youtube.com/watch?v=4RIUI5m00gY

See also

Historical reenactment
Historical martial arts reconstruction
Renaissance Fair
List of historical reenactment groups
Dark Ages reenactment
Medieval Times

 
Reenactment
Middle Ages in popular culture